In cryptography and the theory of computation, Yao's test is a test defined by Andrew Chi-Chih Yao in 1982, against pseudo-random sequences. A sequence of words passes Yao's test if an attacker with reasonable computational power cannot distinguish it from a sequence generated uniformly at random.

Formal statement

Boolean circuits 

We say that  passes Yao's test if for all predicting collection , for all but finitely many , for all polynomial  :

Probabilistic formulation 
As in the case of the next-bit test, the predicting collection used in the above definition can be replaced by a probabilistic Turing machine, working in polynomial time. This also yields a strictly stronger definition of Yao's test (see Adleman's theorem). Indeed, One could decide undecidable properties of the pseudo-random sequence with the non-uniform circuits described above, whereas BPP machines can always be simulated by exponential-time deterministic Turing machines.

References 

Cryptography
Theory of computation